Carr's Tunnel is an abandoned railway tunnel in Greensburg, Pennsylvania. Known locally as Witches' Tunnel, it was originally built in 1856 for the Pennsylvania Railroad. It was brick-lined in 1868-1869. The railway line it was associated with, now dismantled, once ran from Donohoe Station to the now-vanished Carney Station, near the Carney coal mine, and on to Latrobe.

In recent years single-family residences have been built directly adjacent to the abandoned tunnel.

External links
 Video of the tunnel

Gallery

References

Railroad tunnels in Pennsylvania
Pennsylvania Railroad tunnels
Transportation buildings and structures in Westmoreland County, Pennsylvania
Tunnels completed in 1856
1856 establishments in Pennsylvania